Eke or EKE may refer to:

Places 
 Eke, Gotland, Sweden
 Eke, Belgium, a town in Nazareth, Belgium

Other uses 
 Eke (name), a given name and surname
 Eke (dance), a Tongan group dance
 Ekit language
 Etugen Eke, a Mongolian and Turkic earth goddess
 Encrypted key exchange

See also 
 Eek (disambiguation)
 Eke silversword, a flowering plant